Hydropsyche is a genus of netspinning caddisflies in the family Hydropsychidae. There are at least 260 described species in Hydropsyche.

Taxonomic note:
Type species: Hydropsyche cinerea FJ Pictet (selected by HH Ross, 1944, BullIllinois Nat Hist Surv 23: 86).

See also
 List of Hydropsyche species

References

Further reading

External links

 NCBI Taxonomy Browser, Hydropsyche

Trichoptera genera